Tõnu Möls (12 June 1939 in Tartu – 1 December 2019 ) was an Estonian mathematician and biologist.

In 1965 he described the moth Epirrhoe tartuensis.

From 1994 until 2004, he was the president of Estonian Naturalists' Society.

In 2001, he was awarded with Order of the White Star, V class.

References

1939 births
2019 deaths
Estonian mathematicians
Estonian biologists
Recipients of the Order of the White Star, 5th Class
University of Tartu alumni
People from Tartu